Wang Runlan (28 May 1913 – 21 September 1937), or Wang Yunlan, was a Chinese soldier and boxer.

He competed for the Republic of China in the 1936 Summer Olympics, and was eliminated in the first round of the light heavyweight class after losing his fight to Wim Fock.

Wang was killed in a battle against the Japanese army on 21 September 1937 during the Second Sino-Japanese War.

References

External links
Wang Yunlan's profile at Sports Reference.com

1913 births
1937 deaths
Light-heavyweight boxers
People from Hebei
Olympic boxers of China
Sportspeople from Hebei
Boxers at the 1936 Summer Olympics
Chinese male boxers
Military personnel of the Republic of China killed in the Second Sino-Japanese War